Pinus ponderosa, commonly known as the ponderosa pine, bull pine, blackjack pine, western yellow-pine, or filipinus pine is a very large pine tree species of variable habitat native to mountainous regions of western North America. It is the most widely distributed pine species in North America.

Pinus ponderosa grows in various erect forms from British Columbia southward and eastward through 16 western U.S. states and has been successfully introduced in temperate regions of Europe, and in New Zealand. It was first documented in modern science in 1826 in eastern Washington near present-day Spokane (of which it is the official city tree). On that occasion, David Douglas misidentified it as Pinus resinosa (red pine). In 1829, Douglas concluded that he had a new pine among his specimens and coined the name Pinus ponderosa for its heavy wood. In 1836, it was formally named and described by Charles Lawson, a Scottish nurseryman. It was adopted as the official state tree of Montana in 1949.

Description 

Pinus ponderosa is a large coniferous pine (evergreen) tree. The bark helps to distinguish it from other species. Mature to over-mature individuals have yellow to orange-red bark in broad to very broad plates with black crevices. Younger trees have blackish-brown bark, referred to as "blackjacks" by early loggers. Ponderosa pine's five subspecies, as classified by some botanists, can be identified by their characteristically bright-green needles (contrasting with blue-green needles that distinguish Jeffrey pine). The Pacific subspecies has the longest——and most flexible needles in plume-like fascicles of three. The Columbia ponderosa pine has long——and relatively flexible needles in fascicles of three. The Rocky Mountains subspecies has shorter——and stout needles growing in scopulate (bushy, tuft-like) fascicles of two or three. The southwestern subspecies has , stout needles in fascicles of three (averaging ). The central High Plains subspecies is characterized by the fewest needles (1.4 per whorl, on average); stout, upright branches at narrow angles from the trunk; and long green needles——extending farthest along the branch, resembling a fox tail. Needles are widest, stoutest, and fewest (averaging ) for the species.

They are purple when first chewed off by squirrels, but become more brown and spherical as they dry. Each scale has a sharp point.

Sources differ on the scent of P. ponderosa. Some state that the bark smells of turpentine, which could reflect the dominance of terpenes (alpha- and beta-pinenes, and delta-3-carene). Others state that it has no distinctive scent, while still others state that the bark smells like vanilla if sampled from a furrow of the bark. Sources agree that the Jeffrey pine is more strongly scented than the ponderosa pine. When carved into, pitch-filled stumps emit a scent of fresh pitch.

Size 
The measurement was performed by Michael Taylor and Mario Vaden, a professional arborist from Oregon.

Taxonomy 
Modern forestry research has identified five different taxa of P. ponderosa, with differing botanical characters and adaptations to different climatic conditions. Four of these have been termed "geographic races" in forestry literature. Some botanists historically treated some races as distinct species. In modern botanical usage, they best match the rank of subspecies and have been formally published.

Subspecies and varieties 
 Pinus ponderosa subsp. brachyptera Engelm. – southwestern ponderosa pine.
 Four corners transition zone including southern Colorado, southern Utah, northern and central New Mexico and Arizona, westernmost Texas, and a single disjunct population in the far northwestern Oklahoma panhandle. The Gila Wilderness contains one of the world's largest and healthiest forests. Hot with bimodal monsoonal rainfall; wet winters and summers contrast with dry springs and falls; mild winters.
 Pinus ponderosa subsp. critchfieldiana Robert Z. Callaham subsp. novo – Pacific ponderosa pine.
 Western coastal parts of Washington State; Oregon west of the Cascade Range except for the southward-extending Umpqua–Tahoe Transition Zone; California except for both that transition zone and the Transverse-Tehahchapi Mountains Transition zone in southern California and Critchfield's far Southern California Race. Mediterranean hot, dry summers in California; mild wet winters with heavy snow in mountains.
 Pinus ponderosa var. pacifica J.R. Haller & Vivrette – Pacific ponderosa pine.
  on coastal-draining slopes of major mountain ranges in California, and in southwestern Oregon, Washington.
 Pinus ponderosa subsp. ponderosa Douglas ex C. Lawson – Columbia ponderosa pine, North plateau ponderosa pine.
 Southeast British Columbia, eastern Washington State and Oregon east of the Cascade Range,  in northeastern California, northwestern Nevada, Idaho and west of the Helena, Montana, transition zone. Cool, relatively moist summers; very cold, snowy winters (except in the very hot and very dry summers of central Oregon, most notably near Bend, which also has very cold and generally dry winters).
 Pinus ponderosa subsp. readiana Robert Z. Callaham subsp. novo – central High Plains ponderosa pine.
 Southern South Dakota and adjacent northern Nebraska and far eastern Colorado, but neither the northern and southern High Plains nor the Black Hills, which are in P. p. scopulorum. Hot, dry, very windy summers; continental cold, wet winters.
 Pinus ponderosa var. scopulorum (Engelm. in S.Watson) E. Murray, Kalmia 12:23, 1982 – Rocky Mountains ponderosa pine.
 East of the Helena, Montana, transition zone, North & South Dakota, but not the central high plains, Wyoming, Nebraska, northern and central Colorado and Utah, and eastern Nevada. Warm, relatively dry summers; very cold, fairly dry winters.
 Pinus ponderosa var. washoensis (H. Mason & Stockw.) J.R. Haller & Vivrette – Washoe pine.

Distributions of the subspecies in the United States are shown in shadow on the map. Distribution of ponderosa pine is from Critchfield and Little. The closely related five-needled Arizona pine (Pinus arizonica) extends southward into Mexico.

Before the distinctions between the North Plateau race and the Pacific race were fully documented, most botanists assumed that ponderosa pines in both areas were the same. When a botanist and a geneticist from California found in 1948 a distinct tree on Mt. Rose in western Nevada with some marked differences from the ponderosa pine they knew in California, they described it as a new species, Washoe pine Pinus washoensis. Subsequent research determined this to be one of the southernmost outliers of the typical North Plateau race of ponderosa pine. Its current classification is Pinus ponderosa var. washoensis.

An additional variety, tentatively named P. p. var. willamettensis, found in the Willamette Valley in western Oregon, is rare. This is likely just one of the many islands of Pacific subspecies of ponderosa pine occurring in the Willamette Valley and extending north to the southeast end of Puget Sound in Washington.

Distinguishing subspecies 
The subspecies of P. ponderosa can be distinguished by measurements along several dimensions:

Notes

Names of taxa and transition zones are on the map.
Numbers in columns were derived from multiple measurements of samples taken from 10 (infrequently fewer) trees on a varying number of geographically dispersed plots.
Numbers in each cell show calculated mean ± standard error and number of plots.

Distribution 

Pinus ponderosa is a dominant tree in the Kuchler plant association, the ponderosa shrub forest. Like most western pines, the ponderosa generally is associated with mountainous topography. However, it is found on banks of the Niobrara River in Nebraska. Scattered stands occur in the Willamette Valley of Oregon and in the Okanagan Valley and Puget Sound areas of Washington. Stands occur throughout low level valleys in British Columbia reaching as far north as the Thompson, Fraser and Columbia watersheds. In its Northern limits, it only grows below  elevation, but is most common below . It is found on foothills and mid-height peaks of the northern, central, and southern Rocky Mountains, in the Cascade Range, in the Sierra Nevada, and in the maritime-influenced Coast Range. In Arizona, it predominates on the Mogollon Rim and is scattered on the Mogollon Plateau and on mid-height peaks in Arizona and New Mexico. Arizona pine (P. arizonica), found primarily in the mountains of extreme southwestern New Mexico, southeastern Arizona, and northern Mexico and sometimes classified as a variety of ponderosa pine, is presently recognized as a separate species.

Ecology 

The fire cycle for ponderosa pine is 5 to 10 years, in which a natural ignition sparks a low-intensity fire. Low, once-a-decade fires are known to have helped specimens live for half a millennium or more. The tree has thick bark and its buds are protected by needles, allowing even some younger individuals to survive weaker fires. In addition to being adapted to dry, fire-affected areas, the species often appears on the edges of deserts as it is comparatively drought resistant, partly due to the ability to close its leaf pores. It can also draw some of its water from sandy soils. Despite being relatively widespread in the American West, it is intolerant of shade.

Pinus ponderosa needles are the only known food of the caterpillars of the gelechiid moth Chionodes retiniella. Blue stain fungus, Grosmannia clavigera, is introduced in sapwood of P. ponderosa from the galleries of all species in the genus Dendroctonus (mountain pine beetle), which has caused much damage. Western pine and other beetles can be found consuming the bark. The seeds are eaten by squirrels, chipmunks, quail, grouse, and Clark's nutcracker, while mule deer browse the seedlings. American black bears can climb up to 12 feet up a ponderosa.

Pathology 
Pinus ponderosa is affected by Armillaria, Phaeolus schweinitzii, Fomes pini, Atropellis canker, dwarf mistletoe, Polyporus anceps, Verticicladiella, Elytroderma needlecast and western gall rust.

As an invasive species 
Pinus ponderosa is classed as a "wilding pine", and spreads as an invasive species throughout the high country of New Zealand, where it is beginning to take over, causing the native species of plants not to be able to grow in those locations. It is also considered a "weed" in parts of Australia.

Uses 
Native Americans consumed the seeds and sweet inner bark. They chewed the dried pitch, which was also used as a salve. They used the limbs and branches as firewood and building material, and the trunks were carved into canoes. The needles and roots were made into baskets. The needles were also boiled into a solution to treat coughs and fevers.

In the 19th and 20th centuries, old-growth trees were widely used by settlers as lumber, including for railroads. Younger trees are of poor quality for lumber due to the tendency to warp.

Cultivation 
Cultivated as a bonsai, Ponderosas are prized for their rough, flaky bark, contorted trunks, flexible limbs and dramatic deadwood. Collected specimens can be wildly sculpted by their environment, resulting in beautiful twisted trunks, limbs and deadwood. In the mountains they can be found growing in pockets in the rock, stunting their growth. The main challenge for this species in bonsai cultivation, is the natural long length of its needles, which takes years of training and care to reduce.

This species is grown as an ornamental plant in parks and large gardens.

In nuclear testing 
During Operation Upshot–Knothole in 1953, a nuclear test was performed in which 145 ponderosa pines were cut down by the United States Forest Service and transported to Area 5 of the Nevada Test Site, where they were planted into the ground and exposed to a nuclear blast to see what the blast wave would do to a forest. The trees were partially burned and blown over.

Culture 
Pinus ponderosa is the official state tree of Montana. In a 1908 poll to determine the state tree, Montana schoolchildren chose the tree over the Douglas fir, American larch, and cottonwood. However, the tree was not officially named the state tree until 1949.

See also 
 Southern yellow pine

References

General references

External links 

 USDA Plants Profile for Pinus ponderosa (ponderosa pine)
 Gymnosperm Database: Pinus ponderosa
 Calflora Database: Pinus ponderosa (ponderosa pine, western yellow pine)
  Jepson Manual eFlora (TJM2) treatment of Pinus ponderosa
 

ponderosa
Trees of the Western United States
Trees of the West Coast of the United States
Trees of British Columbia
Trees of Northwestern Mexico
Trees of Northeastern Mexico
Trees of the Southwestern United States
Trees of the Northwestern United States
Trees of the South-Central United States
Trees of the North-Central United States
Flora of the Cascade Range
Flora of the Klamath Mountains
Flora of the Rocky Mountains
Flora of the Sierra Nevada (United States)
Flora of Arizona
Flora of California
Flora of Colorado
Flora of Idaho
Flora of Montana
Flora of New Mexico
Flora of Nevada
Flora of Northwestern Mexico
Flora of Oklahoma
Flora of South Dakota
Flora of Texas
Flora of Utah
Flora of Washington (state)
Flora of Wyoming
Natural history of the Transverse Ranges
San Gabriel Mountains
San Bernardino Mountains
Symbols of Montana
Least concern flora of the United States
Plants used in bonsai
Garden plants of North America
Ornamental trees
Plants described in 1836